Ballona Creek (pronunciation: "Bah-yo-nuh" or "Buy-yo-nah") is an  channelized stream in southwestern Los Angeles County, California, United States, that was once a "year-round river lined with sycamores and willows" with the Tongva village of Guashna located at the mouth of the creek. Ballona Creek and neighboring Ballona Wetlands remain a prime bird-watching spot for waterfowl, shorebirds, warblers, and birds of prey.

The urban watercourse begins in the Mid-City neighborhood of Los Angeles, flows through Culver City and Del Rey, and passes the Ballona Wetlands Ecological Preserve, the sailboat harbor Marina del Rey, and the small beachside community of Playa del Rey before draining into Santa Monica Bay. The Ballona Creek drainage basin carries water from the Santa Monica Mountains on the north, from the Baldwin Hills to the south, and as far as the Harbor Freeway (I-110) to the east.

In 1982, film critic Richard von Busack, a native of Culver City, described Ballona Creek as "a cement drainage ditch indistinguishable in size and content from the Love Canal."

Watershed and course

The major tributaries to the Ballona Creek and estuary include Centinela Creek channel, Sepulveda Creek channel and Benedict Canyon channel; most of the creek's natural minor tributaries have been destroyed by development or paved over and flow into Ballona Creek as a network of underground storm drains.

Land use in the watershed consists of 64 percent residential, 17 percent open space, eight percent commercial, and four percent industrial. Note: In Los Angeles County, the "water year" is measured beginning October 1 continuing until the next September 30, rather than by calendar year.

Natural channels remain at some of the headwaters of Ballona Creek tributaries, while the lower portion of the stream is encased in concrete channels "either rectangular" in the east or "trapezoidal" toward the west; to the west of Centinela Avenue the bottom of the creek is unpaved and subject to tidal influence.

Tributaries
Major tributaries of Ballona include:
 Sepulveda Creek
 Sawtelle Channel
 Sepulveda Channel
 Stone Canyon Creek
 Centinela Creek
 Benedict Canyon Creek
 Coldwater Canyon Creek
 Adams Channel

Many of these run wholly or partially underground in storm drains that empty into the creek.

Additional watershed elements 

According to a report from the Los Angeles Department of Water and Power, other contributing elements of the contemporary watershed, besides the major tributaries, are Baldwin Hills Park, Del Rey Lagoon Park, Ballona Lagoon Marine Preserve, Grand Canal, the Venice Canals, Ballona Northeast (Area C—State lands), Bluff Creek and Ballona Wetlands, Marina del Rey (including Marina Del Rey Wetland Park), Oxford Flood Control Basin, and another 15 or so minor tributaries in the Santa Monica Mountains.

Ballona Wetlands, Del Rey Lagoon, Ballona Lagoon and Oxford Basin are connected to the Ballona estuary through tide gates.

The Ballona watershed is estimated to have roughly 35 percent impervious surface, which affects rainwater infiltration and groundwater recharge.

There were at least 41 natural springs mapped in the Río de La Ballona watershed before development. A waterway called Walnut Creek once arose near what is now the L.A. Coliseum at Exposition but it was destroyed by the 1930s flood-control engineering.

A 2011 study determined that as little as two percent of Ballona’s water may now come from underground springs, meaning that 98 percent of the creek's flow consists of various forms of runoff throughout the watershed.

Crossings 

From northern source to southern mouth (year built in parentheses):

 Begins at South Cochran Avenue
 South Burnside Avenue (1974)
 Hauser Boulevard (1974)
 Thurman Avenue (1974)
 South Fairfax Avenue (1962)
 Interstate 10 (1964)
 La Cienega Boulevard (1937)
 Washington Boulevard (1938)
 National Boulevard north (1967), Bike Path Bridge for Expo Line Bikeway since 2009
 Metro E Line (2012) originally Santa Monica Air Line streetcar (1909) 
 National Boulevard south (1967, replaced 2009) 

 Higuera Street (1938, replacement 2023)
 Duquesne Avenue (1938)
 Overland Avenue (1928)
 Ballona Creek Pedestrian Bridge (1951, replaced 2004)
 Sepulveda Boulevard (1985)
 Sawtelle Boulevard (1988)
 Interstate 405 - San Diego Freeway (1960)
 Inglewood Boulevard (1937)
 Centinela Avenue (1938)
 State Route 90 - Marina Freeway (1972)
 Venice–Inglewood streetcar and freight route (crossing removed after 1980, pylons remain circa 2022)
 Lincoln Boulevard/State Route 1 (1937)
 Culver Boulevard (1937)
 Redondo Beach via Playa del Rey Line streetcar (built circa 1903, demolished sometime after 1940)
 Pacific Avenue Bridge (1928) - Now used only by pedestrians and bicycles as part of the Los Angeles Coastal Bike Trail, Pacific Avenue was once a car road continuous from Venice to Playa Del Rey but the construction of the Marina “severed the north-south connection.”

Several of these crossings existed as “small wooden bridges” of unknown age before they were replaced in the 1930s by WPA infrastructure projects. An “old wooden bridge” was in place on Overland before 1928. A 1900 railway map appears to show Ballona Creek crossings at Inglewood, Higuera, and La Cienega and a crossing between Alla and Alsace stations .

Ecology and conservation

Pollution 
Dry weather urban runoff and storm water, both conveyed by storm drains, are the primary sources of pollution in the riverine coastal estuary. "A new city sewer line in the 1980s alleviated some, but not all, of the problem."

The urbanization of the watershed, and associated with it the pollution of urban runoff and stormwater, has degraded the water quality in Ballona Creek and its estuary. Ballona Creek is listed by the Los Angeles Regional Water Quality Control Board impaired for fecal coliform, heavy metals, and pesticides.

The litter flows into the creek require constant cleanup by the County Department of Public Works and volunteer teams. Fifty bags of litter, including diapers, syringes and a car bumper, were removed from Ballona Creek on Coastal Cleanup Day in 1988. Nets and booms strung across the end of the creek attempt to catch as much litter as possible before it enters Santa Monica Bay.

LA County Public Works deployed an Interceptor Original, a solar-powered, automated system made by the Dutch nonprofit The Ocean Cleanup,  near the mouth of the creek in October 2022. This is the first Interceptor Original installed in the United States, and the second of the third-generation Interceptor Original to be deployed globally. Until the system was put into place, it was docked with the United States Coast Guard in Long Beach, California. One boom on the device was damaged in the 2022-2023 storms but the main unit was not damaged.

Another observer described the general state of the creek in 2021:

Habitat 
The creek and wetlands are recognized as an “Important Birding Area” by the Audubon Society. As far as the creek specifically, the best birding opportunities are usually west of Lincoln Boulevard.

Urban coyotes and a small population of venomous southern Pacific rattlesnakes live alongside the creek; exercise due caution to protect both the wildlife and visiting humans.

According to a 2003 assessment, "Less than one percent of the plant cover observed along the Ballona Creek could be classified as native species."

Bottlenose dolphins, harbor seals and California sea lions are occasionally spotted downstream.

History

An alternative historic Spanish-language place name for the creek reported in the GNIS is Sanjón de Agua con Alisos, which roughly translates to “water ditch with sycamores.” (Aliso is the North American Spanish language word for  Platanus racemosa, or Western sycamore, a landmark water-loving, river-bank tree species native to the area. Watercourses or irrigation channels called zanja, zanjón or sanjon are noted throughout southern California and the American Southwest generally.)

A reported Tongva-language (Takic subgroup of Uto-Aztecan) placename for the Ballona estuary and wetlands was Pwinukipar, meaning “it is filled with water.”

Ballona Creek was a picturesque natural waterway fed by runoff. The creek collected the water from ciénegas and the rains. Its banks were lined with sycamores, willows, tules, and other trees. This natural bounty attracted the earliest known human inhabitants of the region, the Gabrieliño-Tongva Indians, the indigenous people of the Los Angeles region. For at least 3,000 years, the pre-Contact Tongva lived in the area encompassing the Ballona Creek floodplain and the Westchester Bluffs. These indigenous peoples left a large burial ground near the region along the southwest corner of the Ballona Wetlands near the village of Guashna, alternatively spelled Washna. The records of the San Gabriel Mission record recruitment of Tongva from a group of settlements named Washna (also referred to in some historical and scholarly sources as Saa’angna) near the mouth of Ballona Creek. Before the Spanish conquest, Washna was probably the most important Native American center for trade between the mainland and Catalina Island.

The Spanish Portolá expedition camped at the headwaters of Ballona on August 3, 1769.

At the time of Spanish settlement, Ballona Creek was a distributary of the Los Angeles River. However, the flood of 1825 changed the course of the Los Angeles River, and Ballona Creek became a distinct waterway.

Around 1820, a mestizo rancher named Augustine Machado claimed a  Mexican land grant that stretched from modern-day Culver City to Pico Boulevard in Santa Monica, California. Ballona Creek and Lagoon are named for the Ballona or Paseo de las Carretas ("wagon pass") land grant, dated November 27, 1839. The Machado and Talamantes families, co-grantees of the rancho, heralded from Baiona in northern Spain.

In the 1840s, Francisco Higuera's adobe was "close enough to La Ballona Creek for Francisco's nine children to swim in the clear waters of the stream with its fine sandy bottom."

From 1861 to 1862 the creek was home to an U.S. Army staging ground. Several soldiers posted to Camp Latham described the local vistas:

In 1886, a California state report described Ballona and Centinela creeks: 
Out from the central springs of the upper belt—on ranchos La Brea and Rodeo de las Aguas—Ballona gathers its upper perennial waters, leads them south against the base of the Centinela hills. Here, reinforced by a little stream from the east, draining the springs of the ranchos La Cienega and Paso de la Tejera, it turns west and southwest, parallel with the hill’s footing, into the Ballona flats and the sea five to six miles away.

Circa 1890, the renowned Machado ranch stables were located "a few hundred feet across the Ballona bridge on Overland Avenue." 

A 1912 advertisement for homes in the “Washington Park subdivision” along the creek said, “Ballona Creek is a swift-running little stream, fed by springs, and carrying plenty of water all the year. It divides in Washington Park, making a picturesque little island.” In addition to other festivities organized by real-estate brokers to drum sales in the new development, “A free luncheon with hot coffee was served on Ballona Island, the wooded island in Ballona Creek.”

The ranch land along the creek was put into agricultural use alongside new small towns such as Venice (est. 1905) and Culver City (est. 1917). In 1928, one writer observed, “Gradually Rancho La Ballona began to develop and people began to build. The ranches were subdivided until Rancho la Ballona became a rich valley of beautiful homes with people coming from every State until it reaches the portions of today.”

Photos of a flooded Jefferson Boulevard appeared in the newspaper after a major storm in December 1931; authorities told reporters that Ballona Creek’s peak flow “more than 7000 second feet” went through the channel. Deadly floods in 1934 led officials to temporarily close “small wooden bridges spanning Ballona Creek” to limit potential danger to civilians. The crossings were at Burnside Avenue, Redondo Boulevard, Thurman Avenue and Venice Boulevard. 

Much of the above-ground section of the creek was lined with concrete as part of the flood-control project undertaken by the United States Army Corps of Engineers between 1935 and 1939. 

In 1931, the Los Angeles County Flood Control District had proposed permanent improvement of the Ballona Channel and included it in its county-wide flood control program. ¶ Subsequently, under the direction of Engineer C.H. Howell, a plan for La Ballona’s improvement was submitted to the federal government. ¶ Major Theodore Wyman Jr. sent his hundreds of workers to straighten and widen the crooked channel that since prehistoric times had been unable to hold the flood waters of rainy seasons that created lagoons and created vast swamp areas. ¶ They not only straightened, widened and deepened the meandering river, they put it in slope-sided, rock-lined strait-jacket. Also they built three bridges, with the aid of a federal grant of $800,000. ¶ The result has been increased flood protection to a wide area and the reclaiming of swamp land. In addition there has been created an estuary, formed by the flow of ocean tides, extending two miles inland from the channel mouth.

Two laborers, Tony Rizzo, a 44-year-old father of six, and Barney Porres, 24, were killed by a mudslide in the channel in 1937. Two other men were injured. A coroner’s jury found that “lack of proper precautions” by flood-control management team were to blame.

A contract was awarded in 1946 to extend the stone jetties an additional  “to deflect ocean currents to prevent beach erosion.”

The tributaries were channelized in the 1950s. Centinela Creek’s course was set in parallel to the route of Interstate 405 and the then-forthcoming Marina Freeway. The channelization of the creek is part of the larger human reorganization of southern California hydrology, “some of the oldest and most extensive water redistribution projects in the United States.”

When the Baldwin Hills Dam broke 1963, the Ballona Creek Channel carried the flood of water and debris safely to the sea.

Recreation

The Ballona Creek Bike Path, which extends almost  from National Boulevard in Culver City to Marina Del Rey, is a popular fitness track. 

More than 30 species of fish are present in the Ballona Del Rey harbor and Ballona estuary. The Ballona Wetlands Land Trust offers a free, full-color, online booklet “A Guide to Fish Found in the Lower Ballona Creek and the Ballona Wetlands.” The Los Angeles Department of Beaches and Harbors permits licensed fishing at the north and south jetties; licenses can be purchased at nearby shops (West Marine, Marina Del Rey Sportfishing or Del Rey Landing). The Ballona Creek jetty is “a good spot for kelp bass, sand bass, and mackerel.”

In 1950, an upstream reservoir was being drained by Los Angeles, and “Bass and blue gill, stocked in the reservoir, ran down storm drains and into Ballona Creek.” The Culver City Chamber of Commerce and Hughes Aircraft Rod & Gun Club erected a temporary dam to trap the fish and threw a fishing contest for local kids. (No adults allowed.)

In popular culture
The Little Rascals of Hal Roach’s Our Gang used Ballona Creek as a filming location for shorts like “Fish Hooky” (1933).

In the 1997 movie Volcano, Mike Roark (Tommy Lee Jones) destroys a 20-story apartment building in a controlled demolition in order to divert a flowing river of lava into Ballona Creek and thus into the Pacific Ocean.

Gallery

See also
 San Gabriel River
 Santa Ana River
 Los Angeles River
 Tongva Sacred Springs
 Centinela Springs
 Brookside, Los Angeles neighborhood
 America’s National Wild and Scenic Rivers designation (Ballona Creek does not qualify at this time)

References

External links
BALLONA CREEK HYDROLOGY (Search “Ballona Creek” for map of channels, underground storm drains and natural tributaries)
 BALLONA CREEK INFRASTRUCTURE (Survey done by Ballona Wetlands Land Trust; check all the boxes-reaches 1 thru 4-and then zoom in to view features)   
 Ballona Creek and Other Urban Watersheds - excellent clear PDF format WATERSHED MAP by LA County Public Works   
 Friends of Ballona Wetlands
 Ballona Creek Renaissance
 ”Birds of Ballona Creek” - 6 min YouTube video
 “A ride along the creek” - 2 min YouTube video
 Ballona Creek Watershed Management Plan of Los Angeles County (224-pg report, illustrated)
 Ballona Creek Revitalization Project - Culver City, includes 20 years of official reports about creek
Historic Ecology of the Ballona Creek Watershed (81-pg report, illustrated)
 Ballona Creek Watershed Total Maximum Daily Loads
 Always Bring Binoculars - Guide to Birding Ballona Creek (4-part guide)
 #1 Birding Ballona Creek: Jetties and Breakwater
 #2 Birding Lower Ballona Creek: Pacific Avenue to Lincoln Boulevard
 #3 Birding Ballona Creek: Lincoln to Inglewood Blvd.
 #4 Birding Ballona Creek: East End, Syd Kronenthal Park to Inglewood Blvd.
 Ballona Wetlands and Creek photo gallery - Citizen of the Planet
 “Ballona Creek rages through Culver City” video from 2019 storm
 undercity.org Ballona Creek Watershed Drains
 LMU Center for Urban Resilience: Urban EcoLab Curriculum Material
 Top 25 Common Los Angeles Birds

Geography of Los Angeles
Baldwin Hills (mountain range)
Mid-City, Los Angeles
Culver City, California
Del Rey, Los Angeles
Playa Vista, Los Angeles
Playa del Rey, Los Angeles
Marina del Rey, California
Westside (Los Angeles County)
Ballona Creek